Sheffield Ecclesall was a Parliamentary constituency represented by a single Member of Parliament in the House of Commons from 1885 to 1950. It returned one Member of Parliament (MP) to the House of Commons of the Parliament of the United Kingdom, elected by the first past the post system.

Boundaries 
1885–1918: Part of the Municipal Borough of Sheffield ward of Ecclesall.

1918–1950: The County Borough of Sheffield wards of Ecclesall and Sharrow.

Ecclesall constituency covered south central Sheffield. Most of the area that made up this constituency is now included in Sheffield Heeley constituency.

History
The seat was created in 1885, prior to its creation the area had been part of the larger Sheffield borough constituency, which was represented by two MPs. The 1885 Redistribution of Seats Act, which sought to eliminate multi-member constituencies and give greater representation to urban areas, led to the break-up of the constituency into five divisions, each represented by a single MP. Ecclesall was one of these new divisions. The seat was abolished in 1950 as part of a redrawing of the Sheffield constituency boundaries that also led to the abolition of Sheffield Central and the creation of Sheffield Heeley and Sheffield Neepsend.

Members of Parliament 

The constituency was abolished in 1950. Peter Roberts subsequently stood for, and won, the new Sheffield Heeley seat.

Election results

Election in the 1940s

Elections in the 1930s

Elections in the 1920s

Elections in the 1910s

Elections in the 1900s

Elections in the 1890s

Elections in the 1880s

 Caused by Ashmead-Bartlett's appointment as Civil Lord of the Admiralty.

References

F. W. S. Craig, British Parliamentary Election Results 1918 - 1949

Ecclesall
Constituencies of the Parliament of the United Kingdom established in 1885
Constituencies of the Parliament of the United Kingdom disestablished in 1950